Cathexis is a genus of longhorn beetles of the subfamily Lamiinae.

 Cathexis grallatrix (Bates, 1865)
 Cathexis longimana (Pascoe, 1859)
 Cathexis vitticollis Zajciw, 1967

References

Colobotheini